The Longest Road is the eleventh studio album by Seals and Crofts, released in July 1980 by Warner Bros. Records. It was the final album the group released before being dropped by the label, and was their last studio album until 2004's Traces. It is also the only Seals and Crofts album with no writing credits for co-founder Dash Crofts. Jim Seals instead wrote most of the songs with pianist Brian Whitcomb. Other guest musicians on the album include Chick Corea and Stanley Clarke of Return to Forever on the jazz fusion opening number "Stars" and Michael Sembello on "If and Any Day".

Track listing 
All songs written by Jim Seals and Brian Whitcomb, except where noted

"Stars"
"Try Your Love"
"First Love" (Seals, Eddie Brown)
"If and Any Day" (Michael Sembello, Marietta Waters)
"Kite Dreams" (Seals, Louie Shelton, Whitcomb)
"Egypt, Israel & America" (Seals)
"The Longest Road"
"I Keep Changing the Faces"
"Silver Rails"
"One Planet, One People, Please" (Seals)

Personnel 
 Jim Seals – lead vocals (except on "If and Any Day"), acoustic guitar (on "Egypt, Israel & America", "Silver Rails", and "One Planet, One People, Please"), tenor sax (on "Stars", "The Longest Road", and "Silver Rails")
 Dash Crofts – lead vocals, mandolin, toy piano on "Silver Rails"
 Louie Shelton – production, electric and acoustic guitars (except on "If and Any Day", "Egypt, Israel & America", "I Keep Changing the Faces", and "One Planet, One People, Please"), bass (on "Try Your Love", "Egypt, Israel & America", "The Longest Road", and "Silver Rails")
 Michael Sembello – electric guitar and keyboards on "If and Any Day"
 Dean Parks - electric guitar and electric sitar on "I Keep Changing the Faces"
 Tony Peluso – additional electric guitar on "Silver Rails", additional acoustic guitar on "One Planet, One People, Please"
 Stanley Clarke - bass on "Stars"
 Bob Glaub - bass on "First Love"
 Nathan Watts - bass on "If and Any Day"
 Dennis Belfield - bass on "Kite Dreams"
 Abraham Laboriel - bass on "I Keep Changing the Faces"
 Brian Whitcomb - electric and acoustic pianos (except on "First Love" and "If and Any Day"), synthesizer on "Kite Dreams" and "The Longest Road"
 Chick Corea - acoustic piano on "Stars"
 Peter Reilich - synthesizer on "Try Your Love"
 Greg Mathieson - electric and acoustic pianos on "First Love"
 Don Freeman - keyboards on "If and Any Day"
 Carlos Vega - drums (except on "If and Any Day" and "The Longest Road")
 Raymond Pounds - drums on "If and Any Day"
 Mike Botts - drums on "The Longest Road"
 Don Heffington - percussion (including congas)
 Victor Feldman - additional percussion on "The Longest Road"
 Julia Tillman, Luther Waters, Oren Waters, and Maxine Willard - background vocals on "Egypt, Israel & America"
 Gene Page – string arrangements for "Try Your Love" and "I Keep Changing the Faces"
 Jimmie Haskell – string arrangement for "First Love"
 Marty Paich – string and horn arrangements for "Egypt, Israel & America"
 Bob Alcivar – string arrangement for "One Planet, One People, Please"

References

External links
 

1980 albums
Seals and Crofts albums
Warner Records albums